Cashton Middle/High School is a public high school located in Cashton, Wisconsin. It is the only high school in the Cashton School District.

Extracurricular activities

Athletics
Boys' and girls' basketball
Football
Cross country
Track and field
Boys' and girls' hockey
Volleyball
Gymnastics
Cheerleading
Wrestling
Baseball
Softball

Cashton has rivalries with both Bangor and New Lisbon.

Clubs
Student organizations include marching band, FBLA, FFA, and art club.

References

Public high schools in Wisconsin
Schools in Monroe County, Wisconsin